The Prey of the Furies (German:Die Beute der Erinnyen) is a 1922 German silent film directed by Otto Rippert and starring Werner Krauss and Dary Holm.

The film's art direction was by Artur Gunther.

Cast
In alphabetical order
 Josef Commer as Charles Cruze  
 Jsa Dschu-Kwo as Fing-Po  
 Felix Hecht as Kapitän Morey  
 Johann Hoffart 
 Dary Holm
 Georg John as Tom Sprang  
 Werner Krauss as Wells  
 Nien Soen Ling as Sing Fu  
 Ressel Orla as Juanita  
 Harald Paulsen as Walter  
 Frida Richard as Anna  
 E. Von Meghen 
 Wolfgang von Schwindt as Olaf Lüttgens  
 Eduard von Winterstein as Knut Hansen

References

Bibliography
 Ames, Eric. Carl Hagenbeck's Empire of Entertainments. University of Washington Press, 2008.

External links

1922 films
Films of the Weimar Republic
German silent feature films
Films directed by Otto Rippert
German black-and-white films